Sets and individual examples of ritual bronzes survive from when they were made mainly during the Chinese Bronze Age. Ritual bronzes create quite an impression both due to their sophistication of design and manufacturing process, but also because of their remarkable durability. From around 1650 BCE, these elaborately decorated vessels were deposited as grave goods in the tombs of royalty and the nobility, and were evidently produced in very large numbers, with documented excavations finding over 200 pieces in a single royal tomb.  They were produced for an individual or social group to use in making ritual offerings of food and drink to his or their ancestors and other deities or spirits. Such ceremonies generally  took place in family temples or ceremonial halls over tombs. These ceremonies can be seen as ritual banquets in which both living and dead members of a family were supposed to participate. Details of these ritual ceremonies are preserved through early literary records. On the death of the owner of a ritual bronze, it would often be placed in his tomb, so that he could continue to pay his respects in the afterlife; other examples were cast specifically as grave goods. Indeed, many surviving examples have been excavated from graves.

The ritual bronzes were probably not used for normal eating and drinking; they represent larger, more elaborate versions of the types of vessels used for this, and made in precious materials. Many of the shapes also survive in pottery, and pottery versions continued to be made in an antiquarian spirit until modern times.  Apart from table vessels, weapons and some other objects were made in special ritual forms. Another class of ritual objects are those, also including weapons, made in jade, which was probably the most highly valued of all, and which had been long used for ritual tools and weapons, since about 4,500 BCE.

At least initially, the production of bronze was probably controlled by the ruler, who gave unformed metal to his nobility as a sign of favour. The technology of bronze production was described in the Kao Gong Ji (Record of Trades, Records of Examination of Craftsman, Book of Diverse Crafts) compiled some time between the fifth and third centuries BCE.

Use
Bronzes are some of the most important pieces of ancient Chinese art, warranting an entire separate catalogue in the Imperial art collections.  The Chinese Bronze Age began in the Xia Dynasty (ca. 2070 – ca. 1600 BC), and bronze ritual containers form the bulk of collections of Chinese antiquities, reaching its zenith during the Shang Dynasty (1600–1046 BC) and the early part of the Zhou Dynasty (1045–256 BC).

The majority of surviving Chinese ancient bronze artefacts are ritual forms rather than their equivalents made for practical use, either as tools or weapons.   Weapons like daggers and axes had a sacrificial meaning, symbolizing the heavenly power of the ruler. The strong religious associations of bronze objects brought up a great number of vessel types and shapes which became regarded as classic and totemic and were copied, often in other media such as Chinese porcelain, throughout subsequent periods of Chinese art.

The ritual books of old China minutely describe who was allowed to use what kinds of sacrificial vessels and how much. The king of Zhou used 9 dings and 8 gui vessels, a duke was allowed to use 7 dings and 6 guis, a baron could use 5 dings and 3 guis, a nobleman was allowed to use 3 dings and 2 guis.  Turning to actual archaeological finds, the tomb of Fu Hao, an unusually powerful Shang queen, contained her set of ritual vessels, numbering over two hundred, which are also far larger than the twenty-four vessels in the tomb of a contemporary nobleman.  Her higher status would have been clear not only to her contemporaries, but also, it was believed, to her ancestors and other spirits.  Many of the pieces were cast with inscriptions using the posthumous form of her name, indicating they were made especially for burial in the tomb.

Metallurgy and origin
The origin of the ores or metals used for Shang and other early Chinese bronze is a current (2018) topic of research. As with other early civilisations (Egypt, Mesopotamia, Indus), Shang settlement was centered on river valleys, and driven in part by the introduction of intensive agriculture. In China such areas lacked ore deposits and required the import of metallurgical material. Typical Shang period bronzes contain over 2% lead, unlike contemporary coppers of the Eurasian Steppe.  Pre-Shang bronzes do not contain the radiogenic lead isotopes. Scholars have sought to determine the source of the ores been based on lead content and trace isotope analysis. In the case of Shang period bronzes, various sites, from early to late Shang period, numerous samples of the bronze alloy are characterized by high radiogenic lead isotope content (derived from both uranium and thorium decay), unlike most known native Chinese lead ores. Potential sources of the ore include Qinling, middle to lower Yangtze area, and south-west China; the possibility that ore or metal was imported from Africa in this period has been proposed, based on potential isotopic matches, but challenged and rejected by other researchers.

The pattern of metal circulation revealed by the existence of highly radiogenic lead remains controversial, partly because radiogenic lead sources may not be as rare in China as initially thought but also because different lead isotope signatures do not necessarily signify different geographical locations, but pockets of radiogenic lead in the same common lead deposit. A recent compositional analysis has proposed that the metals used to manufacture the Chinese ritual bronzes derived from mining progressively deeper ores in deposits close to where many of these bronzes were unearthed, and calls into question interpretations of social, cultural and technological change during the Chinese Bronze Age predicated on the acquisition of metals from disparate regions.  

The bronzes typically contain between 5% and 30% tin and between 2% and 3% lead.

Casting technology

Piece-mold casting
From the Bronze Age to the Han Dynasty, the main technique used in ancient China to cast ritual vessels, weapons and other utensils was the piece-mold casting. In the piece-mold process, a section mold can be formed in two ways. First, a clay mold is formed around the model of the object to be cast and then removed in sections. In the second approach, no model is required. Instead, create a mold inside a clay-lined container and stamp it with the desired finish. In both methods, mold parts are fired and then reassembled. Clay castings are then made, and parts removed. The resulting clay casting looks like a finished product, is allowed to dry, and then filed flat to form a core. This establishes the casting space, which determines the thickness of the finished product. The parts are then reassembled around the core, and the parts are cast. The clay molds are then broken up, and the finished castings are removed and polished with abrasives to obtain a shiny finish. The number of parts the mold is cut into depends entirely on the shape and design of the object to be cast.

Casting-on
Casting is an ancient Chinese casting technique used to attach prefabricated handles and other small accessories to larger bronze objects. This technique has been in use as early as the Bronze Age, first in the South and then in the Shanghe region of the Central Plains. The importance of casting in the manufacture of personal ornaments is that it is used to create the connecting bronze chains.

Lost-wax casting
The earliest archaeological evidence of lost wax casting in China was found in the sixth century BC. The Cemetery of Chu State in Xichuan, Henan Province. Bronze Jin, cast using traditional piece-mold techniques, is further embellished by adding prefabricated ornate open worked handles, which are produced through a lost wax process and then attached. Lost wax was eventually introduced to China from the ancient Near East as far west as possible, and the process has an early and long history in the region, but exactly when and how it was introduced is unclear. The dewaxing process is more suitable for casting decorations with deep undercuts and openwork designs than the molding process, which complicates the removal of molded parts from the model. Although lost-wax casting was never used to make large vessels, it became more and more popular in the late Eastern Zhou Dynasty and the Qin and Han Dynasties. The lost-wax casting process for casting small parts was more economical than the mold-making process because the amount of metal used was easier to control.
The object to be cast is first modeled. Wax, which is easy to shape and carve and which melts away under the proper conditions, has been the most commonly used material for this purpose since antiquity. As a result, this method has been termed the “lost-wax” process. The wax model is then coated with clay to form the mold. The first coat of clay is usually carefully brushed to prevent trapping of air bubbles; subsequent coats may be rougher. Then, the wax model thrown in is burnt at high temperature, so it is called lost wax. Molten metal is then poured into the mold to replace the burnt wax model. After the metal cools, the model is opened to reveal the finished product. The resulting cast object is a metal replica of the original wax model.

Classification of pieces in the Imperial collection
The appreciation, creation and collection of Chinese bronzes as pieces of art and not as ritual items began in the Song dynasty and reached its zenith in the Qing dynasty during the reign of the Qianlong Emperor, whose massive collection is recorded in the catalogues known as the Xiqing gujian (西清古鑑) and the Xiqing jijian (西清繼鑑).  Within those two catalogues, the bronzeware is categorized according to use:
Sacrificial vessels (祭器, jìqì),
Wine vessels (酒器, jiǔqì),
Food vessels (食器, shíqì),
Water vessels (水器, shuǐqì),
Musical instruments (樂器, yuèqì),
Weapons (兵器, bīngqì),
Measuring containers (量器, liángqì),
Ancient money (錢幣, qiánbì), and
Miscellaneous (雜器, záqì).

The most highly prized are generally the sacrificial and wine vessels, which form the majority of most collections. Often these vessels are elaborately decorated with taotie designs.

Sacrificial vessels 

Dǐng (鼎)  Sacrificial vessel (祭器), originally a cauldron for cooking and storing meat (食器). The Shang prototype has a round bowl, wider than it is tall, set on three legs (足); there are two short handles on each side (耳). Later examples became larger and larger and were considered a measure of power. It is considered the single most important class of Chinese bronzeware in terms of its cultural importance. There is a variation called a fāngdǐng (方鼎) which has a square bowl and four legs at each corner. There exist rare forms with lids. 西清古鑒 contains over two hundred examples, and this is the most highly regarded of all Chinese bronzes.
Dòu (豆): Sacrificial vessel (祭器) that was originally a food vessel. Flat, covered bowl on a long stem.
Fǔ (簠): Rectangular dish, triangular in vertical cross-section. Always with a lid shaped like the dish.
Zūn (尊 or 樽 or 鐏): Wine vessel and sacrificial vessel (器為盛酒亦祭用也). Tall cylindrical wine cup, with no handles or legs. The mouth is usually slightly broader than the body. In the late Zhōu (周) dynasty, this type of vessel became exceedingly elaborate, often taking the shape of animals and abandoning the traditional shape. These later types are distinguished from gōng (觥) by retaining a small, roughly circular mouth. This type of vessel forms the second largest group of objects in the Xiqing gujian, after the dǐng (鼎).
Zǔ (俎): Flat rectangular platform with square legs at each corner. Not represented in the Xiqing gujian.
Yí (彝): Sacrificial vessel. Two forms: A. Large squat round pot with two handles; B. Tall box-like container, the base narrower than the mouth with a roof-like lid. Later became a generic name for all sacrificial vessels.

Wine vessels 

Gōng (觥, not pronounced guāng): Wine vessel often elongated and carved in the shape of an animal. There is always a cover and the mouth of the vessel usually covers the length of the vessel. This is not a classification used in the Xiqing gujian; objects of this type are classed under 匜 (Yi (vessel)).
Gū (觚): Tall wine cup with no handles, the mouth larger than its base.
Guǐ (簋): A bowl with two handles.
Hé (盉): A wine vessel shaped like a tea pot with three legs. It has a handle (pàn 鋬) and a straight spout that points diagonally upwards.
Jiǎ (斝): A cauldron for warming wine. Like a dǐng (鼎) except the body is taller than it is broad, and it may have two sticks (柱) sticking straight up from the brim, acting as handles.
Jué (角, not pronounced jiǎo): A wine cup similar to a 爵, except the spout and brim extension are identical and there is a cover.
Jué (爵): A wine cup with three legs, a spout (流) with a pointed brim extension (尾) diametrically opposite, plus a handle (鋬).
Léi (罍): Vessel for wine with a round body, a neck, a cover and a handle on either side of the mouth.
Lì (鬲): Cauldron with three legs. Similar to a dǐng (鼎) except the legs blend into the body or have large swellings on top.
Zhī (卮/巵/梔): Wine vessel, and also a measuring container. Like a píng (瓶), except shorter and broader.
Zhōng (鍾): A wine vessel with no handles.
Zun (尊/樽/鐏): Wine vessel and sacrificial vessel (器為盛酒亦祭用也). Tall cylindrical wine cup, with no handles or legs. The mouth is usually slightly broader than the body. In the late Zhou Dynasty, this type of vessel became exceedingly elaborate, often taking the shape of animals and abandoning the traditional shape. These later types are distinguished from gōng (觥) by retaining a small, roughly circular mouth. This type of vessel forms the second largest group of objects in the Xiqing gujian, after the dǐng (鼎).

Food vessels 

Duì (敦, not pronounced dūn): Spherical dish with a cover to protect its contents from dust and other contaminants.
Pán (盤): Round curved dish for food. May have no legs, or it may have three or four short legs.
Yǒu (卣): Covered pot with a single looping handle attached on opposite sides of the mouth of the vessel.
Zèng (甑): A rice pot; referred to as a 腹 fu4 in Xiqing gujian. Has no separate category in 西清古鑑: see yǎn (甗).

Water vessels
Bù (瓿): see pǒu (瓿)
Dǒu 斗: Scoop. Tall bowl with a long handle.
Móu (鍪): A vase with two handles. Vessels of this type are classed as hú (壺) in the Xiqing gujian.
Píng (瓶): Tall vase with a long slender neck opening up to a narrow mouth.
Pǒu (瓿, pronounced bù in China): A small bronze wèng (甕).
Wèng (瓮 or 甕): Round mouthed, round bellied jar with no foot for holding water or wine. Now commonly used to hold ashes.
Yàndī (硯滴): Water container for an ink stone; often in the shape of an animal with a long thin dropper to control the amount of water dispensed.
Yí (匜): A bowl or ewer with a spout; May be elaborately shaped like an animal.
Yú (盂): Basin for water. May have up to four decorative handles around the edge; no brim.
Zhì (觶): Broad-mouthed vase, similar in shape to a hú (壺), but with no handles.
Zhōng (盅): Small cup with no handles. Not represented in Xiqing gujian.

Musical instruments 
Bó (鈸): Cymbals. Not represented in the Xiqing gujian. See náo (鐃).
Gǔ (鼓): A drum.
Líng (鈴): A small bell (as might be hung from ribbons). This item is not represented in Xiqing gujian.
Náo (鐃): Cymbals. Not represented in Xiqing gujian. See also bó (鈸).
Zhōng (鐘): A large bell, as might stand in a tower.

Weapons 
Duì (鐓, not pronounced dūn): Bronze decoration for the end of a spear or halberd handle; often with an animal motif.
Jiàn (劍): A sword. There are only three examples in Xiqing gujian.
Nǔjī (弩機): Crossbow mechanism. There are only two examples in the Xiqing gujian.
Pī (鈹): A type of sword.
Zú (鏃): An arrow head.

Measuring containers 
Zhī (卮 or 巵 or 梔): A wine vessel and also a measuring container. Like a píng (瓶), except shorter and broader.

Ancient money 
Bù (布)  or bùwén (布文): Ancient money (錢幣). Rectangular with two legs and a head. Type of qián (錢)
Fúyìnqián (符印錢): Taoist amulet minted in the shape of a yuán (圓), usually with an incantation on the obverse and picture on the reverse.
Qián (錢): Ancient money (錢幣). Well represented in 西清古鑑; occurs in three types: 布, 刀, 圓(元) q.v.
Yuán (圓): Also called yuánbì (圓幣), yuánbǎo (元寶), or yuánqián (元錢). Circular coins with a hole in the middle, usually made of copper or bronze; what most Westerners think of as 'Chinese money'. Also see fúyìnqián (符印錢).

Miscellaneous 

Biǎozuò (表座) Cylindrical container with added animal motif. There are only three examples in the Xiqing gujian.
Jiàn (鑑 or 鑒): Refers to two different objects: either a tall, broad bronze dish for water, or a circular bronze mirror, usually with intricate ornamentation on the back.  The modern meaning is a mirror.
Jué (钁): Farming implement shaped like a pickaxe, but used as a hoe. 西清古鑑 contains only two examples; the rubric states: 按說文大鉏也又博雅斫謂之钁 "According to the Shouwen [an ancient Chinese dictionary] it is a large hoe, that is called a jué by the learned." Only the bronze heads of the two examples survive, because the wooden handles have long rotted away.
Lú (鑪): A brazier. These are a nebulously classified group of bronze vessels and there are a number of forms: A. It may similar to a dǐng (鼎) with very short legs sitting on a pán (盤); or B., a duì (敦) on a pán (盤); or C., like a dòu (豆) on a pán (盤).
Shūzhèn (書鎮):  Paper weight. Usually solid bronze, moulded in the shape of a reclining or crouching animal (three recorded in Xiqing gujian).
Xǔ (盨): A vessel with two ears and lid, serving as a food container (may not appear in the "Imperial Collection").

Patterns and decorations

Taotie

The taotie pattern was a popular bronze-ware decorative design in the Shang dynasty and the subsequent Zhou dynasty, named by scholars of the Song dynasty (960-1279) according to records in literature of the Warring States period of Master Lu's Spring and Autumn Annals.

The typical taotie pattern is a full-face round-eyed animal head, with sharp teeth and horns. In all of these patterns, the eyes are always the focus. The huge eyes leave an awesome impression on viewers even from a distance. The taotie pattern features rich variations from one bronze piece to another because one ceramic mold could only cast one bronze work in the early days of casting. The most obvious difference between taotie patterns are the horns, some have ox horns, some sheep horns, and some have tiger's ears, distinguishing animal origins of different images.

See also
 History of Chinese archaeology

Notes

References
Rawson, Jessica (ed). The British Museum Book of Chinese Art, 2007 (2nd edn), British Museum Press, 
Sickman, Laurence, in: Sickman L & Soper A, "The Art and Architecture of China", Pelican History of Art, 3rd ed 1971, Penguin (now Yale History of Art), LOC 70-125675
Xi'an Jiaqiang (in Chinese)

Further reading
Wang Tao (ed.) Mirroring China's Past: Emperors, Scholars, and their Bronzes (with chapters by Sarah Allan, Jeffrey Moser, Su Rongyu, Zhixin Sun, Zhou Ya, Liu Yu and Lu Zhang), Art Institute of Chicago/Yale Books, 2018, to coincide with a major exhibition in 2018.

https://www.getty.edu/conservation/publications_resources/pdf_publications/pdf/ancientmetals2.pdf Chinese Bronzes: Casting, Finishing, Patination, and Corrosion
http://www.academia.edu/3459636/The_Intersection_of_Past_And_Present_The_Qianlong_Emperor_and_His_Ancient_Bronzes

External links

ritual vessels from AAT-Taiwan
Frick Collection ARCADE

Visual arts terminology
Bronzes

Chinese iconography
Chinese inventions
Bronze Age art
Bronze Age in China